Mary Henrietta Graham (1857 or 1858 – January 2, 1890) was the first African-American woman to be admitted to the University of Michigan, as well as the first biracial person to graduate from it.

Early life 
Graham was born in Windsor, Ontario, to a white Englishwoman mother (Sarah) and black father (Levi) from Illinois, making her biracial. She was the second oldest of at least four children. At some point in her youth, she moved to Flint, Michigan, where she graduated from Flint High School in 1876. She went by the nickname "Mollie."

Education 
In 1880, she graduated from the University of Michigan with a Bachelor's of Philosophy in Literature. While in Ann Arbor, she lived at 10 Maynard Street and, later, 4 N. State St.

After graduating, she gained a post as a teacher at Lincoln University in Jefferson, Missouri.

Later life 
In 1882, she married the journalist, lawyer, and civil rights activist Ferdinand Lee Barnett. They lived in Chicago and worked on Barnett's newspaper The Chicago Conservator, the first black newspaper in the city. Mary and Ferdinand had two children, Ferdinand Lee (born 1884) and Albert Graham Barnett. 

Mary died in Chicago on January 2, 1890 of heart disease. An obituary in the files of the Bentley Historical Library reads:At the time of her death, she was in the prime of useful vigorous life, the blow coming without a moment’s warning … During her short career of usefulness, she had come to be regarded not only as a woman of highest moral integrity, but of splendid ability and brilliant promise.After Mary's death, her widower Ferdinand married Ida B. Wells in 1895.

Legacy 
In 2017, University of Michigan students suggested changing the name of the C. C. Little Building to honor Graham instead, putting a temporary sign with her name over the existing sign. In 2018, the name "C.C. Little" was dropped, and the building is currently referred to by its address, 1100 North University.

External links 

 Record in the African-American Student Project, from the Bentley Historical Library

References 

1850s births
1890 deaths
University of Michigan alumni
Black Canadian women
Canadian emigrants to the United States
People from Windsor, Ontario
19th-century Canadian women
19th-century African-American women
Canadian people of American descent
Canadian people of African-American descent
People from Flint, Michigan
People from Chicago